Grand prince or great prince (feminine: grand princess or great princess) (Greek: megas archon) is a title of nobility ranked in honour below emperor, equal of king or archduke and above a sovereign prince.

Grand duke is the usual and established, though not literal, translation of these terms in English and Romance languages, which do not normally use separate words for a "prince" who reigns as a monarch (e.g., Albert II, Prince of Monaco) and a "prince" who does not reign, but belongs to a monarch's family (e.g., Prince George of Wales). Some Slavic (Królewicz), Germanic, Dutch, and Scandinavian languages do use separate words to express this concept, and in those languages grand prince is understood as a distinct title (for a cadet of a dynasty) from grand duke (hereditary ruler ranking below a king). Some recent sources also use Archduke.

The title of grand prince was once used for the sovereign of a grand principality. The last titular grand principalities vanished in 1917 and 1918, the territories being united into other monarchies or becoming republics. Already at that stage, the grand principalities of Lithuania, Transylvania and Finland had been for centuries under rulers of other, bigger monarchies, so that the title of grand prince was superseded by the titles "king" and "emperor" there. Ivan IV of Moscow in the 16th century was the last sovereign to reign whose highest title was velikiy knyaz, until he assumed the rank of Tsar of Russia. "Velikiy knyaz" is a  Russian title that is often translated as "grand prince"  because there are no better equivalents in European languages. When Ivan IV's pre-tsarist title is referred to in English, however, it is usually as grand duke.

Velikiy knjaz is also a Russian courtesy title for members of the family of the Russian tsar (from the 17th century), although the people who owned this title were not sovereigns.

Terminology in Slavic and Baltic languages
Velikiy knyaz (Meaning closest to Grand Prince but was generally translated as Grand Duke in state documents written in Latin), used in the Slavic and Baltic languages, was the title of a medieval monarch who headed a more-or-less loose confederation whose constituent parts were ruled by lesser knyazs ( often translated as "princes" ) . Those great knyazs' (grand princes') title and position was at the time sometimes translated as king, though kings, princes, and dukes seemingly initially did not exist amongst proto-Slavs and Balts with Knyaz being a Germanic loanword adopted by tribal chieftains.  Although, the Slavic  and the Baltic  (nowadays usually translated as prince) are similar to kings in terms of ruling and duties. However, a velikiy knyaz (grand prince) was usually only  within a dynasty, primogeniture not governing the order of succession. All knyazs (princes) of the family were equally eligible to inherit a crown (for example, succession might be through agnatic seniority or rotation). Often other members of the dynasty ruled some constituent parts of the monarchy/country.  An established use of the title was in the Kievan Rus' and in the Grand Duchy of Lithuania (from the 14th century). Thus, Veliki Knjaz has been more like a regional high king (but without international recognition as such) than "grand duke", at least, originally and were not subordinated to any other authority as more western (for example Polish) Grand Dukes were. As these countries expanded territorially and moved towards primogeniture and centralization, their rulers acquired more elevated titles.

Use in the Middle Ages

Hungary
 
Grand Prince was the title used by contemporary sources to name the leader of the federation of the Hungarian tribes in the 10th century. It was used by Géza and his son and heir Stephen of Hungary.

Serbia
 
In the Middle Ages, the Serbian veliki župan (велики жупан) was the supreme chieftain in the multi-tribal society. The title signifies overlordship, as the leader of lesser chieftains titled župan. It was used by the Serb rulers in the 11th and 12th centuries. In Greek, it was known as archizoupanos (ἄρχιζουπάνος), megazoupanos (μεγαζουπάνος) and megalos zoupanos (μεγάλος ζουπάνος).

In the 1090s, Vukan became the veliki župan in Raška (Rascia). Stefan Nemanja expelled his brother Tihomir in 1168 and assumed the title of veliki župan, as described in the Charter of Hilandar. A Latin document used mega iupanus for King Stefan the First-Crowned. Afterwards, it was a high noble rank with notable holders such as Altoman Vojinović ( 1335–59).

Kievan Rus' and successor states
 (literally, great prince) was, starting in the 10th century, the title of the leading Prince of the Kievan Rus', head of the Rurikid House: first the prince of Kiev, and then that of Vladimir and Galicia-Volhynia starting in the 13th century.  Later, several princes of nationally important cities, which comprised vassal appanage principalities, held this title (Grand Prince of Moscow, Tver', Yaroslavl', Ryazan', Smolensk, etc.).  From 1328 the Grand Prince of Moscow appeared as the titular head of eastern Rus' and slowly centralized power until Ivan IV was crowned tsar in 1547. Since then, the title grand prince ceased to be a hereditary office and became a generic title for members of the Imperial family until the Russian Revolution of 1917.

Polish–Lithuanian Commonwealth
The Lithuanian title  was used by the rulers of Lithuania, and after 1569, it was one of two main titles used by the monarch of the Polish–Lithuanian Commonwealth. The kings of Poland from the Swedish House of Vasa also used this title for their non-Polish territories.

Modern use

In 1582,  King Johan III of Sweden added Grand Prince of Finland to the subsidiary titles of the Swedish kings, however without any territorial or civic implications, Finland already being a fully integrated part of the Swedish realm.

The Holy Roman Empire ruling house of Habsburg instituted a similar Grand Principality in Transylvania (Siebenburgen) in 1765.

After the Russian conquests, the title continued to be used by the Russian emperor in his role as ruler of Lithuania (1793–1918) and of autonomous Finland (1809–1917) as well. His titulary included, among other titles: "Grand Duke of Smolensk, Volynia, Podolia", "Lord and Grand Duke of Nizhni Novgorod, Chernigov" etc.

A more literal translation of the Russian title than grand duke would be great prince — especially in the pre-Petrine era — but the term is neither standard nor widely used in English.

Grand prince remained as a dynastic title for the senior members of the Romanov dynasty in Russia's imperial era. The title , its use finally formalized by Alexander III, then belonged to children and male-line grandchildren of the emperors of Russia. The daughters and paternal granddaughters of the emperors used a different version of the title (Velikaya Knyazhna) from females who obtained it as the consorts of Russian grand princes (Velikie Knyagini). In modern times a Russian Grand Duke or Grand Duchess is styled Imperial Highness.

The title grand prince was also used for the heir apparent to the Grand Duchy of Tuscany.

See also 
 Grand Prince of the Hungarians
 Royal and noble ranks
 Titles of nobility

References

Royal titles
Noble titles